Kenya Kohara (born 29 August 1994) is a Japanese judoka.

He is the silver medallist of the 2018 Judo Grand Slam Osaka in the -81 kg category.

References

External links
 

1994 births
Living people
Japanese male judoka
21st-century Japanese people